Jason Allen (born 26 September 1975) is a former professional rugby league footballer who played in the 1990s. He played for the Australian club the Newcastle Knights in 1998.

References

External links
]http://www.rugbyleagueproject.org/players/Jason_Allen/summary.html Statistics at rugbyleagueproject.org]

1975 births
Living people
Australian rugby league players
Newcastle Knights players